KPT may refer to:
 Kai's Power Tools, a set of API plugins
 Karachi Port Trust
 Karnataka (Govt.) Polytechnic, a government collage in India
 Kertapati railway station, Palembang, South Sumatra, Indonesia (station code: KPT)
 Xanthan ketal pyruvate transferase, an enzyme
 Koparit, a sports club in Kuopio, Finland